Malminder Gill (born in Kent, United Kingdom) is a self-help author and holistic therapist from England.

Career 
Prior to starting her career in Hypnosis and Coaching, Gill worked in the Digital Industry focusing on the development and integration of digital  in emerging markets.

In 2008 she started training in NLP (neuro-linguistic programming) Coaching in Buenos Aires, Argentina. She later became involved in Hypnosis and Life Coaching.   Gill went on to practice Hypnotherapy at the established Harley Street Therapy Centre.

She has written Unleash Your Inner Goddess And Stop Worrying which was featured in Woman & Home Top 3 Best Self-Help Reads in 2014. Gill provides regular opinion and comment on the latest self-help interventions on the Huffington Post blog.

Publications

Books 

 Unleash Your Inner Goddess And Stop Worrying Malminder Gill 2014

Studies 

 Anatomy and Pathophysiology of Chronic Pain and the Impact of Hypnotherapy Malminder Gill 2017

References 

1 Institute of Enterprise And Entrepreneurs (IOEE) - Malminder Gill
2 Irish Daily Star - Organize A Better Life For Yourself
3 Woman & Home - Three of The Best New Self-Help Reads
4 Huffington Post - Malminder Gill
5 Female First - Exclusive Interview with Malminder Gill
6 Times of India - How I Start My Day
7 Daily Express - How To Stop Worrying
8 Take A Break - How To Stop Jealousy
9 Woman's Way - Detach Yourself From Your Worries
10 The Professional - Managing Yourself

British self-help writers
British hypnotists
Living people
Year of birth missing (living people)